Hidari (ヒダリ) is a rock band from Kobe, Japan, known for its combination of modern rock and retro electronic sounds.

Members

Hiroshi Ohta (太田宏) - guitar, vocals
Yukihiro (ユキヒロ) - mecha

Former members
Hiroshi "Yoma" Aoki (青木ヨーマ), electronics, keyboards
Justin Bacon (ジャスティン ベイコン), mecha
Daisuke Kouzuki (上月大介) - bass, backup vocals

Name
The word hidari means "left" in Japanese, though the actual origin of the band's name comes from the first syllable of each of the three founding members' names, "Hiroshi", "Daisuke", and "Ryosuke". For that reason, it is spelled in the phonetic alphabet of katakana instead of the more representative kanji.

Discography

References

External links
zousanrecords.com/hidari/ Hidari's Official Website (English & Japanese)
Bad News Records (Japanese)

Japanese rock music groups
Musical groups from Hyōgo Prefecture

no:Hidari